EN Ibrahim Moulavi (Malayalam:ഇ എന്‍ ഇബ്രാഹിം  മൌലവി ) is an Hafiz and Islamic scholar from Kerala. He has authored many books on Islam. He was the Imam and Khateeb of Masjidul Huda, Cheruvadi.

Biography
E N Ibrahim Moulavi was born to Ezhimala E N Ahmed Musliar and M T Fathima in 1948 at Cheruvadi in  Kozhikode district, Kerala. Ezhimala Ahmed Musliar was a reputed Islamic scholar who migrated from Kannur to Cheruvadi. He was the Imam of Cheruvadi Puthiyoth Juma Masjid. He has got seven sons and one daughter and EN Ibrahim is the fourth one. EN Ibrahim's eldest brother EN Mohammed Moulavi is a well known hadeeth scholar of Kerala. Other brothers are also famous Islamic scholars.
Ibrahim, after the basic studies from his father studied at different masjids and then at Vazhakkad Darul Uloom, Pattikkadu Jamia Nooriya and Farooq Roudhathul Uloom. He has taught in Vazhakkad Darussalam Madrasa, Shivapuram Islamiya College and Chennamangallur Islahiya College.
He was the Khateeb of Masjidul Huda, Cheruvadi for years.

Select works
 Siddique al-Akbar
 Isthigasa Islamika Veekshanathil (Isthigasa - Islamic View)
 Tharaveeh Namaskaram (Tharaveeh Prayer)
 Juz Amma Paribasha (Translation of Juz Amma)
 Pravaajakathwa Parisamaapthi
 Sunnathum Bid'athum
 Sunni Vimarshanangalku Marupadi
 Punya Kendrangalilude
 Mahacharitha Mala - 1 - Pravachanam Pularunnu
 Imam Aboohaneefa

Translations
 Sheeism - Oru Aathma Vicharana
 Kakshi Vazhakku
 Rasool Ameen (co-translator - M A Abdul Salam)
 Nahjul Balagha - Vaagwilaasathinte Raajapaatha

References

External links
 http://www.iphkerala.com/Author/EN.Ibraheem.html
 http://www.iphkerala.com/History_Eng.html
 https://web.archive.org/web/20101202082702/http://pusthakakkada.com/list.php?cat=13
 EN Mohammed Moulavi https://web.archive.org/web/20110721162239/http://www.hijracalendar.in/?p=426

Living people
Indian Muslims
Year of birth missing (living people)